Principal Cordillera is the Andean mountain range that makes up the boundary between Central Chile and neighbouring areas of Argentina. It is also a  continental divide between the Atlantic and the Pacific watersheds. It extends in a north–south direction in the Argentine provinces of La Rioja, San Juan and Mendoza and the Chilean regions of Valparaíso, Santiago, O'Higgins and Maule. To the east of the Principal Cordillera lies the Frontal Cordillera which is fully in Argentina. Aconcagua, the tallest mountain outside Asia, lies in the Principal Cordillera.

Geological history
What is today the Principal Cordillera was once a depression that accumulated sediments. Lava flows from ancient volcanoes also found their way to the depression. Today these sequences of sedimentary and volcanic rock can be observed high in the Andes, implying their basin was closed and uplifted by tectonic inversion. The said rocks are grouped in the Abanico and Farellones Formation. Tectonic inversion took place 21 to 16 million years (Ma) ago, yet the associated pulse of uplift continued until about 8 Ma ago. The Miocene continental divide was about 20 km to the west of the modern water divide that makes up the Argentina–Chile border. Subsequent river incision shifted the divide to the east leaving old flattish surfaces hanging. Compression and uplift in this part of the Andes has continued into the present. The Principal Cordillera had risen to heights that allowed for the development of valley glaciers about 1 Ma ago.

References

Bibliography

 
Argentina–Chile border
Geography of La Rioja Province, Argentina
Geography of San Juan Province, Argentina
Mountain ranges of Argentina
Mountain ranges of Chile
Geography of Maule Region
Geography of Mendoza Province
Geography of O'Higgins Region
Geography of Santiago Metropolitan Region
Geography of Santiago, Chile
Geography of Valparaíso Region